Gustave Kervern (born 27 August 1962), also known as Gustave de Kervern and Gustave K/Vern, is a French actor, director and screenwriter. He is best known for his collaboration with Benoît Delépine.

Life and career
In 2004 he wrote, directed, and starred in Aaltra with Benoît Delépine. Also with Delépine, he has directed and starred in Avida, which was screened out of competition at the 2006 Cannes Film Festival. The duos film Louise-Michel won a Special Jury Prize at the 2009 Sundance Film Festival. Their 2010 film Mammuth starred Gérard Depardieu and Isabelle Adjani. It was nominated for the Golden Bear award at the 60th Berlin International Film Festival.

Their 2012 film Le Grand Soir competed in the Un Certain Regard section at the 2012 Cannes Film Festival where it won the Special Jury Prize.

Selected filmography

As actor

As filmmaker

References

External links

1962 births
French film directors
Living people
French people of Breton descent
French male film actors
French male television actors
French male screenwriters
French screenwriters
French film producers
20th-century French male actors
21st-century French male actors